"Born in East L.A." is a single by Cheech & Chong, released in September 1985. It is a parody of Bruce Springsteen's "Born in the U.S.A.", with references to the song "I Love L.A." by Randy Newman. The song rose to  48 on the Billboard Hot 100.

Written by Cheech Marin, the song's lyrics deal with a Mexican-American man from East Los Angeles who is mistaken for an undocumented immigrant and deported. The song served as the basis for the film of the same name, directed by Marin.

Background 

Cheech Marin wrote the song without his comedy partner Tommy Chong, although Chong was credited for the song's writing on the album and single. Chong was subsequently insulted when Marin asked him to perform backup vocals on the song, and it was recorded without Chong. It is one of only two Cheech & Chong songs written solely by one member of the duo and not in collaboration, the other being Tommy Chong's "Up in Smoke".

Music video 

A music video for the song was produced and appeared in the home video release Get Out of My Room. The video featured appearances from Cassandra Peterson as Elvira, Mistress of the Dark, Jan-Michael Vincent, Ángel Ramírez and Sal Lopez.

Reception 

The song was released as Springsteen's "Born in the U.S.A." tour was ending, missing the Top 40. The subsequently released music video became popular.

Charts

Film 

The song served as the basis for the film Born in East L.A., directed by Marin, which also starred the role alongside Paul Rodriguez, Daniel Stern, Kamala Lopez-Dawson, Jan-Michael Vincent and  Lupe Ontiveros. The film debuted well in its first week but dropped by 40% in its second week at the box office.

See also
Death Valley Days, a show which featured then actor Ronald Reagan, who the protagonist of the song confuses for John Wayne when asked who the President is.

References 

1985 songs
Novelty songs
Cheech and Chong songs
Songs about Los Angeles